Jamek Mosque, officially Sultan Abdul Samad Jamek Mosque is one of the oldest mosques in Kuala Lumpur, Malaysia. It is located at the confluence of the Klang and Gombak River and may be accessed via Jalan Tun Perak.  The mosque was designed by Arthur Benison Hubback, and built in 1909.

The name "Jamek" is  the Malay equivalent of the Arabic word jāmiʿ  meaning a place where people congregate to worship.  It is also referred to as "Friday Mosque" by the locals.

History

The mosque was built on the location of an old Malay burial place at the confluence of Klang and Gombak River and named Jamek Mosque. A couple of mosques previously existed in the Java Street and Malay Street area serving the Malay communities, but Jamek Mosque was the first large mosque to be built in Kuala Lumpur. The foundation stone of the mosque was laid by the Sultan of Selangor, Sultan Sir Alaeddin Sulaiman Shah on 23 March 1908, and the Sultan officially opened the mosque on 23 December 1909. The construction of the mosque cost $32,625, funded in part by the Malay community with contribution from the British colonial government. The architect was Arthur Benison Hubback who designed the mosque in the Indo-Saracenic style, loosely reflecting Indian Muslim Mughal architectural style. Masjid Jamek served as Kuala Lumpur's main mosque until the national mosque, Masjid Negara, was built in 1965.

The mosque has since been enlarged with extensions built, and the originally open-air forecourt roofed over.  One of the domes of the mosque collapsed in 1993 due to heavy rain, but has since been repaired.

On 23 June 2017, the mosque was renamed Sultan Abdul Samad Jamek Mosque by Selangor's Sultan Sharafuddin Idris Shah after his ancestor — the fourth Sultan of Selangor Sultan Abdul Samad — as the mosque was originally built on land that was part of the state of Selangor.

Features

The design of the mosque has been described as a Moorish, Indo-Saracenic or Mughal architecture. A. B Hubback also designed a number of building in similar style, such as the Kuala Lumpur railway station and the Ubudiah Mosque in Kuala Kangsar. The mosque has 2 main minarets among other smaller ones; the  pattern of pink and white banding of the minarets, formed of brick and plaster, has been described as  "blood and bandage". The mosque has 3 domes, the largest of which reached   in height. The prayer hall is located beneath the domes. The mosque was refurbished in 1984 and the minaret nearest the river was underpinned as it was already sloping.

Access

The mosque lends its name to the Masjid Jamek LRT station located just outside the mosque compound. The station is among Kuala Lumpur's busiest metro interchanges, being served by the Kelana Jaya Line, Sri Petaling Line and Ampang Line. The station is located between Chinatown and Little India; Dataran Merdeka is also nearby.

Imams and Muadhins of Jamek Mosque

Imams 
 Chief of Imams Sultan Abdul Samad Jamek Mosque : 
 Ustaz Hj. Muhammad bin Awang Besar (1976-1995)
 Ustaz Ahmad Tarmizi bin Abdul Razak 
 Ustaz Mohd Saiful Azhar (2010)
 Ustaz Mohd Faisal bin Tan Mutallib (2010–Nov 2017)
 Ustaz Haji Yahya Mahyuddin bin Datuk Haji Utoh Said (Dec 2017–Now)

 Imams:
 Ustaz Late Hj. Abdul Halim bin Yatim (1994 - 12 December 2018)
 Ustaz Mohd Zamri bin Shafie (2004-2013)
 Ustaz Mohd Hisyam bin Azman (2012-2013)
 Ustaz Mohd Syukri bin Ismail (2012–31 December 2019)
 Ustaz Ahmad Nizzam bin Rasali (2014–present )
 Ustaz Ahmad Firdaus bin Nordin (2013 - 2014)
 Ustaz Abdul Razak bin Ismail (Feb 2015-2016)
 Ustaz Muhammad Farhan bin Nasharuddin (Feb 2015–present)
 Ustaz Muhammad Adeeb bin Nasharuddin (November 2017 – present)
 Ustaz Luqman Bin Abdul Majid (1 Feb 2020 - present)

Muadhins 
Chief Of Muadhins  :
 Ustaz Mohd Izwan bin Sharif (Until Nov 2014)
 Ustaz Nor Azaruddin bin Ahmad (2014 - now)
 Ustaz Azli bin Ibrahim (2019 - now)
Muadhins : 
 Ustaz Mohd Al-Shahqafi (2011-2012)
 Ustaz Mohd Syukri bin Ismail (December 2011-July 2012)
 Ustaz Muhammad Hafiz bin Mohd Arif (Since July 2012 – present)
 Ustaz Mohd Farhan bin Nasharuddin  (Since Jun 2013-Jan 2015)
 Ustaz Mohd Raizal (2013-2014)
 Ustaz Ahmad Sayuti bin Ismail (Since Feb 2015-2016)
 Ustaz Haji Syed Hasri bin Syed Omar Al-Habsyi (Jan-December 2017)
 Ustaz Zulfadli bin Jaafar (2018-now)
 Ustaz Azmarul Husnika (Since November 2017 – present)

See also
 Islam in Malaysia
 Islamic architecture

Gallery

References

Mosques completed in 1909
Jamek
Mosque buildings with domes
Sultan